Monarchism in the United States is the advocacy of a monarchical form of government in the United States of America. During the American Revolution a significant element of the population remained loyal to the British crown. However, aside from a few considerations in the 1780s, since independence there has not been any serious movement for an American monarchy.

Revolutionary period

During the American Revolution, those American colonists who stayed loyal to the British crown were termed "Loyalists". Historians have estimated that between 15 and 20% of the 2,000,000 whites in the colonies in 1775 were Loyalists (300,000–400,000). The revolutionary war officially ended in 1783 with the signing of the Treaty of Paris. This marked the official end of monarchy in the United States with George III of the United Kingdom being the last monarch.

Confederation period 

In the 1780s, in the period between the American Revolution and the ratification of the United States Constitution, several propositions for creating an independent monarchy were considered.

George Washington 
On May 22, 1782, the Newburgh letter was sent to George Washington who was camped at Newburgh, New York; written for the army officers by Colonel Lewis Nicola, it proposed that Washington should become the King of the United States. Washington reacted very strongly against the suggestion, and was greatly troubled by it, turning it down in favor of a republican government.

Prussian Scheme 

In 1786, the President of the Continental Congress, Nathaniel Gorham, acting in possible concert with other persons influential in the government of the United States, is reported to have offered the crown to Henry of Prussia, a prince of the House of Hohenzollern and brother of Frederick the Great, possibly with the aim of resolving the ongoing political crises occurring during the last days of the Articles of Confederation. According to Rufus King, Gorham secretly corresponded with Prince Henry of Prussia for this purpose. The attempt may have died due to a lack of interest on Henry's part, popular opposition to a rumored proposal involving a different potential monarch, the convening of the Philadelphia Convention, or some combination thereof.

Constitutional Convention of 1787 

Alexander Hamilton argued in a long speech before the Constitutional Convention of 1787 that the President of the United States should be an elective monarch, ruling for "good behavior" (i.e., for life, unless impeached) and with extensive powers. Hamilton believed that elective monarchs had sufficient power domestically to resist foreign corruption, yet there was enough domestic control over their behavior to prevent tyranny at home. Hamilton argued, "And let me observe that an executive is less dangerous to the liberties of the people when in office during life than for seven years.  It may be said this constitutes as an elective monarchy... But by making the executive subject to impeachment, the term 'monarchy' cannot apply..." His proposal was resoundingly voted down in favor of a four-year term with the possibility of reelection.

In his later defense of the Constitution in The Federalist Papers, he often hints that a lifetime executive might be better, even as he praises the system with the four-year term. Political scientist Erik von Kuehnelt-Leddihn wrote that Hamilton "regretted that the United States could not become a monarchy."

Modern monarchism
Since America has declared independence, support of monarchy has possessed a generally low popularity, though it has increased slightly over time. In 1950, 3% of Americans said it would be a good idea for America to possess a royal family, while 93% thought it would be bad. This question was re-asked in 1999, where 11% of Americans answered that in favor of a royal family would be good for the United States & 87% against. A 2013 CNN poll found that 13% of Americans would be open to the United States possessing a royal family again. A 2018 poll asking if America would be better or worse if it possessed a constitutional monarchy had 11% of Americans answering better & 36% answering worse. A 2021 poll by YouGov found that 5% of Americans would consider it a good thing for the United States to have a monarchy (7% support among men & 4% support among women), with 69% answering that it would be a bad thing. In the YouGov poll, African-Americans were most likely to answer positively in favor of a monarchy at 10% support.

The Constantian Society, founded in 1970 by Randall J. Dicks, was a political group in the devoted to promoting the system of constitutional monarchy as a superior form of government, though its activities ceased with its founders death in 1999.

Some notable American monarchists include:

 Michael Auslin (Writer, historian, and policy analyst)
 Lee Walter Congdon (Writer and historian)
 Charles A. Coulombe (Writer and historian)
 Ralph Adams Cram (Architect and writer)
 Nathaniel Gorham (Politician and Founding Father of the United States)
 Alexander Hamilton (Politician and Founding Father of the United States)
 Solange Hertz (Writer)
 William S. Lind (Political advisor and writer)
 Thomas Mace-Archer-Mills (Commentator)
 Lewis Nicola (Military Officer and writer)
 Joshua Norton (Trader, real estate speculator, & self-proclaimed Emperor of the United States)
 James Strang (Religious leader and politician)
 Curtis Yarvin (Political theorist and software developer)
 Leland B. Yeager (Economist)

Notes

References 

 
Political movements in the United States